Acleris comariana, the strawberry tortrix, is a moth of the family Tortricidae. It is found in Europe, the Caucasus, Amur, Kamchatka, China, Korea and Japan.

The wingspan is 13–18 mm. The ground colour of the forewing is extremely variable, sometimes embellished with blackish scale tufts and often with a costal blotch. Hindwings are grey.
 Julius von Kennel provides a full description. 

The larvae feed on wild and cultivated strawberries and related plants and can become a pest in strawberry fields.

References

comariana
Insects of Korea
Moths of Asia
Tortricidae of Europe
Moths of New Zealand
Moths described in 1846